Karagar or Cell 145 is a thriller web series directed by Syed Ahmed Shawki, started streaming on the Bengali OTT platform Hoichoi from 19 August 2022. Hoichoi announced their upcoming new five web series, Karagar is one of them, Based on Bangladesh, the series features Chanchal Chowdhury, Intekhab Dinar, Tasnia Farin and FS Nayeem in the lead roles.

After the release of the first part of the web series, it gained popularity among the audience and became the talk of the town. Even the popularity of this Bangladeshi series spread beyond the country to India. Karagar helped the OTT platform Hoichoi to grow their business in Bangladesh.

Premise
Akashnagar Jail is a prison in Bangladesh. Cell No. 145 of this jail has been closed since 1971. It is soon known that there is a prisoner inside that cell. Senior authorities break the old lock of the cell and enter it. When asked how he came to be in this cell, the mute prisoner hinted that he had been imprisoned for killing Mir Jafar in  1771 and had been transferred to different prisons at various times including Kala Pani Jail.

Cast and characters

Main
 Chanchal Chowdhury as David Adam alias the mystery man
 Dibbo Joyti as young David Adam
 Intekhab Dinar as Mostak Ahmed, the prison warden of Akashnagar Jail
 Tasnia Farin as Maha
 Shatabdi Wadud as Alfred
 Tanvin Sweety as Dia Guha, the mysterious woman in the burqa
 Mir Naufel Ashrafi Jisan as Raju, a prisoner and the associate of David Adam

Supporting
 Jayanta Chattopadhyay as Gulzar, one of prisoners
 Afzal Hossain as Mohabbat Ali, the hangman
 Bijori Barkatullah as Panna, wife of Mostak
 FS Nayeem as Ashfaq Mawla, an officer of Detective Branch and friend of Mostak
 AK Azad Shetu as Abul Khayer, a prison officer
 Partho Sheikh as prisoner Sajib, son of Mostak and Panna
 Zahid Hasan Shovon as Humayun Kabir, IG Prison
 Sarker Raunak Ripon as Aslam
 Omar Masum as Ataur
 Abdullah al Sentu

Episodes

Part 1
The first season of Karagar was released on 19 August 2022 with seven episodes. In the first season, Mostak meets the mysterious prisoner who claims that he killed Mir Jafar. Maha is the interpreter who interprets his statement to police.

Part 2
On 21 September 2022, the Hoichoi authority announced that the second part of the web series will be released in December of the same year on the occasion of the sixth anniversary of the establishment of their platform. On 4 November, the date of Part 2 was fixed on 15 December 2022. Later the date was changed to 22 December due to the 2022 FIFA World Cup.

Production

Neamoth Ullah Masum got the concept for it from "Kaktaal", a Bangladeshi rock band from the Old Dhaka Central Jail, whose members are temporary and briefly defected to get out of the jail. Before this web series, Syed Ahmed Shawki and Neamoth Ullah Masum worked in the web series Taqdeer. Neamoth suggested the director to make Karagar. The duo completed the web series concept in 3-4 months. The story of the web series was then written for a year. While writing the story, suggestions were taken from the crew and actors of the web series. The director had already decided that Chanchal Chowdhury would be cast in the lead role of the web series. For the ideas for the series, director Shawki formed a panel of writers with Neamoth Ullah Masum, Suhan Rizwan, Rasheduzzaman Rakib and Siddiq Ahmed who helped in the pre-production of the series.

The filming was done for two consecutive weeks. Chanchal fell ill due to continuous acting in the unsanitary environment of the prison. The production team had to do a lot of historical research to write its plot. In September 2021, Hoichoi announced the release of the Karagar web series to mark its fifth anniversary. The two parts of the web series have been shot simultaneously. Most of its scenes were shot in Old Dhaka Central Jail which is currently closed for renovation work. Atia Rahman did the make-up work of the actors including Chanchal, who tried to make his look realistic. For the story, Chanchal and Farin had to learn sign language for three months. A sign language teacher was present on location during the filming. After the release of Part 1 on 19 August 2022, post-production work on Part 2 of the web series began in September 2022.

Reception

Influence
Miraz Hossain of The Business Standard wrote about the first part "Taqdeer famed director Syed Ahmed Shawki makes the series gripping with suspense intensifying in every episode, but the ending is so abrupt, unexpected, and intriguing that it feels incomplete, almost like not drinking water after a full meal." Zahid Akbar of The Daily Star thinks part 1 of the series especially with its unsolved mysteries and Chanchal Chowdhury's performance left such an impression on the audience that they kept trying to solve the mysteries and the series became the talk of the town. As a result of this, the audience eagerly awaited the release of part 2.

Critical response

Part 1
After the release of part 1 of the web series, it and its performers received positive response from the audience. The art and entertainment desk of The Daily Star called it a unique storyline web series. Poorna Banerjee of The Times of India rated Part one 4/5 and praised the performance of Chanchal Chowdhury, the lead actor of the web series. Saykot Kabir Shayok of The Business Standard said about the web series, "If keeping the audience hooked from the beginning to the end was the only criteria for a show to shine then Karagar season one passed with flying colours". Shadique Mahbub Islam of The Financial Express praised its plot and screenplay. Jannatul Naym Pieal of The Business Post said its editing was average and it disappointed at the end of the first part, but he praised its background music. According to Biswadeep Dey of Sangbad Pratidin, Karagar has managed to gain popularity in both Bengals. Calling it an "ambitious production", Priyanka Chowdhury of The Daily Star does not think that this unfinished web series is unsatisfactory. She thinks that the theological and mystical settings is perfect for the series. Soumya Mukhopadhyay, the chief operating officer of Hoichoi, said Karagar has contributed a lot to its business growth in Bangladesh.

Part 2
According to Pritha Biswas of Anandabazar Patrika, part two revealed the unsolved mysteries of the previous part, but some of them were unsatisfactory. Sub plots are not given importance in this part. The series managed to create suspense but failed to create emotion among the audience. Besides, she wrote "the actors have a lot of credit behind the huge popularity of this series". Biswadip Dey of Sangbad Pratidin felt that despite being a thriller work, part 2 lacked any trace of thriller element. But according to him it represented the Bengali culture and turned into an excellent web series despite refraining from using sexuality and slang for popularity. According to Jannatul Naym Pieal of The Business Post, the story is fantastic but the director failed to convey it to the audience in the series properly in the second part. Poorna Banerjee of The Times of India praised the cinematography of Karagar but criticized it for having plot holes and lacking satisfactory answers to the mysteries. According to her, it would have been better to develop the story slowly instead of ending it abruptly. Agnivo Niyogi of The Telegraph thinks it was better to exclude unnecessary subplots from part 2 and the sequel is worthy to watch. According to Muhammad Asadullah of Bdnews24.com it has the potential to be the best web series of 2022. To him, it also raised the standard of Bengali-language web series. According to Miraz Hossain of The Business Standard, Part 2 is good, but compared to Part 1, it may seem worse. However, he praised Naufel who played the role of Raju and called him the star of the part. According to Razia Sultana Jenni of Amader Shomoy, the series lost its unpredictability due to the introduction of the Bangladesh Liberation War in the plot of Part 2 and from that part it turned from thriller to melodrama. As a result, the creator of the series lost the opportunity to bring novelty to its story.

References

External links

 Karagar on Hoichoi
 Karagar on Amazon Prime Video
 

2022 web series debuts
Thriller web series
Mystery web series
Prison web series
Bangladeshi web series
Bengali-language web series
2022 Bangladeshi television series debuts
2020s Bangladeshi drama television series
Television shows filmed in Bangladesh
Hoichoi original programming